{{Infobox person
| name         = Vishal Kotian
| image        = 
| caption      = 
| birth_date   = 
| birth_place  = Mumbai, Maharashtra, India
| occupation   = Actor, entertainer
| years_active = 1998—present
| known_for    = Har Mushkil Ka Hal Akbar BirbalAkbar Ka Bal Birbal
}}
Vishal Kotian is an Indian film and television actor. He is known for playing the role of Birbal in Har Mushkil Ka Hal Akbar Birbal and Akbar Ka Bal Birbal. In 2021, he participated in Bigg Boss 15''.

Television

Film

References

External links
 
 
 

Living people
Tulu people
Indian male film actors
Indian male television actors
Bigg Boss (Hindi TV series) contestants
1979 births